Harat Zuwayyah (also Ḩārat Zuwayyah) is a town located in south-east Libya, in the Cyrenaica Region and Khufra District. The town has an area of around 8 km and is 1 km north of Rabyanah, both residing in the basin of an intermittent oasis on the foothills of a small cluster of mountains, with a zenith of 600m. Harat Zuwayyah is roughly 135 km west of its nearest major road which includes the settlement al-Jawf.

References 

Populated places in Kufra District